Theatronetto is an Israeli theater festival that exhibits monodramas, and takes place in Tel Aviv annually since 1990. The festival establishes a direct dialog between the solo actor and the viewing audience. The festival takes place annually during the Jewish holiday of Passover, usually in April. Its main event is a contest, to which's finals few monoactors manage to reach. 

The festival's name is a mix of the Hebrew words theatron (meaning theater) and netto (meaning only, just). The name emphasizes the essence of the festival, which is exposing the audience to monologues, the rawest and of the oldest forms of theater, and testing the actors' verbal delivery abilities and presenting the monologue as an enjoyable and crowd-swaying story and play. 

Some of the finest actors in Israel have performed on the festival's stage and have promoted the difficult form of monologue in Israeli theater. Traditionally the festival took place at the Suzanne Dellal Center, and later on moved to Habima Theater and once to Acre as well, and included only Israeli plays, but in 2008 it moved to the alleys of Old Jaffa and since has been taking place there and from 2011 accepting foreign plays and guests as well. In 2009, the festival was expanded as a children's competition was introduced. 

The festival's initiator and chairman is Yaakov Agmon. The following is a quote of his in regards to Theatronetto's uniqueness: 

The festival awards competition winning artists the "Theatronetto Prize", named after Nisim Azikari and funded by the Tel Aviv Yehoshua Rabbinovich Foundation for the Arts and Matan Project.

External links
Theatronetto on HaBama website
Theatronetto on The Arab-Hebrew Theater's website

Theatre festivals in Israel
1990 establishments in Israel
Spring (season) events in Israel
Festivals in Tel Aviv